Westona railway station is located on the Werribee line in Victoria, Australia. It serves the western Melbourne suburb of Altona, and opened on 21 January 1985.

Westona is a crossing loop in the middle of a 10-kilometre-long section of single track between Altona Junction and Laverton. The direction in which trains cross at Westona is unusual for Melbourne, in that they pass each other on the left, rather than passing on the more common right.

History
Westona station opened on 21 January 1985, when the railway line from Altona was extended. Upon opening, it was briefly the terminus of the line, with the up face of the island platform (Platform 1) only in use. On 14 April of that year, the track was extended to Laverton. The station was named by Joanna O'Connor, Alan Angus and Betty Angus, who won a council-run contest to find a name. Because the new station was west of Altona, they suggested Westona.

In 1986, control of all signals and points were transferred to the Newport signal box, with the signal control panel moved to the relay room for maintenance purposes only.

Platforms and services
Westona has one island platform with two faces. It is served by Werribee line trains.

Platform 1:
  all stations and limited express services to Flinders Street and Frankston

Platform 2:
  all stations shuttle services to Laverton (weekdays only); all stations services to Werribee

Transport links
CDC Melbourne operates one bus route via Westona station, under contract to Public Transport Victoria:
 : Laverton station – Williamstown

References

External links
 Melway map at street-directory.com.au

Railway stations in Melbourne
Railway stations in Australia opened in 1985
Railway stations in the City of Hobsons Bay